Hiroden Streetcar route #5 runs between Hiroshima Station and Hiroshima Port via Hijiyama-shita.

Overview

Lines
Horoden Streetcar route #5 is made up of next three lines. The train goes straight through from each direction.

 █ Hiroden Main Line
 █ Hiroden Hijiyama Line
 █ Hiroden Ujina Line

Stations

References

5